"My Story" is a single by American R&B singer R. Kelly featuring 2 Chainz, written by R. Kelly who co-produced it with Nineteen85 from OVO Sound, for his twelfth solo studio album Black Panties. A snippet of the song was first heard at the BET Awards same year, then another a week after the award ceremony. The song was released on November 3, 2012 via R. Kelly's Vevo, and on iTunes a day later. The second snippet was not in the official song, but later heard on the extended version of the song. The song debuted at #89 on the hot 100 during the week of the album's release after many weeks on the bubbling under chart. No official music video will be released, but a documentary music video has been uploaded on R. Kelly's Vevo channel and a fan video was expected, but was never released.

Music video
30 August 2013 the documentary music video was uploaded on YouTube, a fan video was expected, but was never released. No official music video has or will be made for this song.

Remixes 
On November 18, 2013, Chicago Remix of "My Story" featured Chicago rappers Katie Got Bandz and Rockie Fresh. On December 5, 2013, the LA Remix of "My Story", featuring rappers Too Short and Nipsey Hussle.

Live performance 
R. Kelly performed this song for the first time on BET 2013 with a golden cap and jacket with spikes. R. Kelly performed "My Story" for the first time with the featuring artist 2 Chainz at Jimmy Kimmel Live! on the fifth of December 2013.

Critical reception 
"My Story" has received average ratings, with critics displaying mixed feelings for the song. Rolling Stone gave it three stars out of five.

Formats and track listings 
 Digital download
 "My Story" feat. 2 Chainz – 3:36

Chart performance

Weekly charts

Year-end charts

References 

R. Kelly songs
2013 songs
2 Chainz songs
2013 singles
RCA Records singles
Songs written by R. Kelly
Song recordings produced by R. Kelly